Anthony Mancini is the name of:

Anthony Mancini (bishop), Canadian bishop
Anthony Mancini (footballer), French footballer